The city of Benton Harbor, Michigan, U.S., has had two major riots.

1966 

On August 30, 1966, a riot began after a meeting discussing recreational facilities and police relations with respect to black residents. During the riot, a black 18-year-old named Cecil Hunt was killed in a drive-by shooting; suspects were arrested but the assault charge was later dismissed. Governor George W. Romney dispatched troops from the Michigan National Guard, who stood down on September 5 when the riot dissipated.

2003 

In June 2003, several citizens in Benton Harbor demonstrated for two days when black motorcyclist Terrance Shurn, being chased by a police officer, crashed into a building and died. As many as 300 state troopers and law enforcement personnel from neighboring communities were called to Benton Harbor.

Indirectly, the riot contributed to the Jimmy Carter Work Project's 2005 activities being held in Benton Harbor and Detroit.

Other years 

Benton Harbor also experienced rioting in 1960, 1967, and 1990.

See also
List of incidents of civil unrest in the United States

References

External links 
 Benton Harbor, A Plan for Positive Change: Final Report of the Governor’s Benton Harbor Task Force, Reverend James Atterberry and Greg Roberts, co-chairs, October 15, 2003, archived March 13, 2006

1966 in Michigan
1966 riots
2003 in Michigan
2003 riots
African-American riots in the United States
Benton Harbor, Michigan
Lists of riots
Riots and civil disorder in Michigan